King Xuanhui of Han (died 312 BC), known as Marquess Wei of Han before 323 BC, was a ruler of the state of Han during the Warring States period in Chinese history. In 325 BC, he met with King Hui of Wei, who honoured him as "king". However, Marquess Wei would only formally declare himself king in 323 BC, along with the rulers of four other states: Zhongshan, Wei, Yan, and Zhao.

Ancestors

312 BC
Zhou dynasty nobility
Monarchs of Han (state)
Year of birth unknown
310s BC deaths
4th-century BC Chinese monarchs